Nzambi a Mpungu is the Kongolese name for a high creator god. The idea of such a god spread from Central Africa into other Kongo related religions. Among other Central African Bantu peoples, such as the Chokwe, Nzambi is also called Kalunga. This may have a connection to an element of Bakongo cosmology called Kalûnga. It is seen as the spark of fire that begot all life in the universe.

History

Nzambi is mentioned as the name for God as early as the early sixteenth century by Portuguese visitors to the Kingdom of Kongo.  This deity has been known as the high and creator god from before this time until today.

European missionaries along with Kongo intellectuals (including King Afonso I of Kongo) set out to render European Christian religious concepts into Kikongo and they chose this name to represent God.  Jesuit missionaries in the 1540s noted the acceptance of this relationship as well, and it was probably included in the now lost catechism produced by Carmelites in Kikongo in 1557.  Certainly it was used for God in the catechism of 1624, a translation by the "best masters of the church" in Kongo under the supervision of the Jesuit priest Mateus Cardoso.

It is not clear if the elevation of Nzambi a Mpungu to the status of creator god and equivalent to the Christian God by priests and missionaries was the reason that he is regarded as such by modern Kongo cosmology, or whether he was always considered the creator.  However, in the Kingdom of Loango, a Kikongo-speaking area that never accepted Christianity as its national religion, reports by Dutch visitors also gave this as the name for God.

Theology

Kongo mythology
Nzambi Mpungu is the Supreme Creator of the Bakongo people and the universe. After creation he became bored with the world and mostly withdrew from it. However, Nzambi Mpungu still animates the natural occurrences of the world. His feminine counterpart is Nzambici, the "God the essence, the god on Earth, the great princess, the mother of all the animals, and the mystery of the Earth." She was sent to Earth by Nzambi Mpungu. They later married, and he officially became the Father of all creation. Nzambici is also believed to have stolen some of Nzambi Mpungu's fire, or kalûnga, gaining power in her own right. One Kikongo saying is "Ku tombi Nzambi ko, kadi ka kena ye nitu ko." It means "Don’t look for God, He does not have a body."

Candomblé Bantu
In the religion of Candomblé Bantu, Nzambi is the "sovereign master". He created the earth and then withdrew from the world. Nzambi Mpungu remains responsible for rainfall and health.

Kumina
In the religion of Kumina there is a high creator god is known as "King Zombi" which is a derivative of Nzambi Mpungu.

Palo
In the religion of Palo, "Nzambi" is the god who created the universe and animates it. Nzambi resides in all natural things, and the spirits of the dead. Long deceased ancestors who have become spirits will over a long period of time become enveloped in the natural elements and thus Nzambi himself. The natural powers of Nzambi can be harnessed by a Nganga and in common ceremonies.

References

 Thornton, John K.  "The Development of an African Catholic Church in the Kingdom of Kongo, 1491–1750," Journal of African History 25 (1984)

Creator gods
Kongo language
Names of God in African traditional religions